C'est la Vie is a comic strip by Jennifer Babcock. Since November 11, 2003, the strip has been syndicated on the web by Uclick/Universal Uclick/Andrews McMeel Syndication.

Before it was picked up for syndication, C'est la Vie premiered in UCLA's Daily Bruin.  It was also self-published by the artist on the web. 

The primary character of the comic is Mona Montrois, a chain-smoking Parisienne living in Los Angeles.  Her sidekick is Monsieur Smokey, a lewd, chauvinistic stuffed bunny.

External links
 
 First comic at the Daily Bruin in 2001
 Interview with Jennifer Babcock about C'est la Vie at WCBN-FM
 Interview with Jennifer Babcock about C'est la Vie at Comixtalk
 Interview with Jennifer Babcock about C'est la Vie at Gigcast

American comic strips
2003 comics debuts
Gag-a-day comics
Comics set in Los Angeles